The Duchy of Akhalkalaki (referred as the Duchy of Javakheti) was a duchy (saeristavo) in medieval Georgia. Duchy was created by King Leon III of Abkhazia (957–967).

History 
It was first mentioned on the inscriptions in Kumurdo Cathedral. Until 1021, the Dukes of Javakheti were members of Marushiani family. It passed to the Tmogveli and then the Toreli family. From the 12th to 13th centuries, the Toreli family also owned estates in Tori, Lesser and Inner Kartli. Pressured by the princes of Samtskhe of the Jaqeli dynasty in the 14th century, the Torelis were forced to move to Shida Kartli and the duchy was absorbed into Principality of Samtskhe.

Rulers 
 Zuiai (~964)
 Vache (960 – 70's)
 Zviad (10–11th century)
 Pharsman Tmogveli (1023–1065)
 Varazbakur Toreli (1065 – ?)
 Kakha Toreli (1152)
 Gamrekeli Toreli (1170's – 1191)
 Kakha II Toreli (1191 – ?)
 Shalva Toreli-Akhaltiskheli (? – 1226)
 Gamrekeli III Toreli (1225 – ?)
 Kakha III Toreli (1250 – 70's)
 Gamrekel Ghobiari (13th century)

See also 
Duchy of Tskhumi
Duchy of Racha

References 

Duchies of the Kingdom of Georgia
Javakheti